Until 2018, the nearest airport to the north-eastern Indian state of Sikkim was Bagdogra Airport located 124 kilometres from the state capital Gangtok. The state had no airport of its own. However, in 2018, the state's first airport in Pakyong was opened for public use after it was inaugurated by Indian Prime Minister Narendra Modi. In October 2018, SpiceJet became the first airline to launch flights to Pakyong Airport from Delhi and Kolkata. Opening of the Pakyong Airport also marked the opening of India's 100th airport.

List
The list includes the airports in Sikkim with their respective ICAO and IATA codes.

References

Sikkim
Buildings and structures in Sikkim